Johan Göransson Gyllenstierna (18 February 1635 – 10 June 1680) was a Swedish statesman.

Biography
He completed his studies at Uppsala University and then visited most of the European states, which laid the foundation for his deep insight into international politics which afterwards distinguished him. On his return home he met King Charles X in the Danish islands and was in close attendance upon him until the monarch's death in 1660.

He began his political career at the diet which assembled in the autumn of the same year. An aristocrat by birth, he nevertheless belonged to a family which had not benefitted from the lavishness of recent regimes. Both personal interest and patriotism thus contributed to his zeal for the recovery of the crown lands and for strengthening the crown against the aristocratic families.

In the Upper House he was the spokesman of the gentry against the magnates, whose inordinate privileges he sought to curtail or abolish. His adversaries vainly endeavoured to gain his favour, for as court-marshal and senator he was still more hostile to the dominant patricians who followed the adventurous policy of Magnus Gabriel De la Gardie. Thus he opposed the French alliance which de la Gardie carried through in 1672 and consistently advocated economy in domestic and neutrality in foreign affairs.

On the outbreak of the Scanian War in 1675 he was the most loyal and energetic supporter of the young king Charles XI and finally became his indispensable counsellor. Indeed, it may be said that the political principles which he instilled into the youthful monarch were faithfully followed by Charles during the whole of his reign.

In 1679 Gyllenstierna was appointed the Swedish plenipotentiary at the peace congress of Lund. The alliance which he then concluded with Denmark bound the two northern realms together in a common foreign policy, and he sought to facilitate their harmonious co-operation by every means possible. In 1680, after bringing home Charles XI's Danish bride from Copenhagen, he was appointed governor-general of Scania (Skåne), but died a few weeks later.

Notes

References

 This work in turn cites:
M. Höjer, Öfversigt af Sveriges yttre politik under åren 1676-1680, Upsala, 1875.

1635 births
1680 deaths
Gyllenstierna Goransson, Johan
Gyllenstierna Goransson, Johan
17th-century Swedish politicians